A kraj ( kraje) is the highest-level administrative unit in the Czech Republic and the Slovak Republic. For lack of other English expressions, the Slavic term is often translated as "province", "region", or "territory", although it approximately means "(part of) country", or "(part of) countryside". A kraj is subdivided into okresy ("districts").

The first kraje were created in the Kingdom of Bohemia during the reign of Charles IV in the 14th century and they lasted till 1862/68. Kraje were reintroduced in 1949 in Czechoslovakia and still exist today (except for the early 1990s) in its successor states despite many rearrangements.

In Russia nine of the 85 federal subjects are called krais (края, kraya), coequal to oblasts. The toponym Krajina refers to several historical regions in Slavic countries.

Kraje in the Czech Republic

Kraje in Slovakia

See also
Bohemia#Traditional administrative divisions
Federal subjects of Russia
Krajina
Semasiological map for *krajь

References

External links 
  etymology of the word

 
 
Types of administrative division